Brooke's Bank is a historic plantation house located near Loretto, Essex County, Virginia. It was built in 1751, and is a two-story, five bay, brick dwelling with a hipped roof in the Georgian style. It has two 20th century one-story brick wings. The original interior woodwork of Brooke's Bank survives almost completely intact.  During the American Civil War, it was shelled by the USS Parmee, a Union gunboat on the Rappahannock River.

It was listed on the National Register of Historic Places in 1971.

References

External links
Brooke's Bank, U.S. Route 17 vicinity, Loretto, Essex County, VA: 1 photo, 15 measured drawings, and 1 photo caption page at Historic American Buildings Survey

Historic American Buildings Survey in Virginia
Plantation houses in Virginia
Houses on the National Register of Historic Places in Virginia
Georgian architecture in Virginia
Houses completed in 1751
Houses in Essex County, Virginia
National Register of Historic Places in Essex County, Virginia
1751 establishments in Virginia
Taliaferro family of Virginia